The women's doubles table tennis event was part of the table tennis programme and took place between 28 and 31 May, at the Waseda University Gymnasium. 9 teams from 5 nations entered for the tournament, teams from the same NOC would not face each other before the final.

The Japanese duo of Fujie Eguchi and Kazuko Yamaizumi won the gold medal after beating Baguio Wong and Ng Yuk Chun from Hong Kong 21–13, 21–12, 21–3 in the final.

Schedule
All times are Japan Standard Time (UTC+09:00)

Results

References

 Official Report

External links
ITTF Database

Table tennis at the 1958 Asian Games